Torre is an Italian and Spanish surname meaning "tower". Notable people with the surname include:

Surname
Arath de la Torre, Mexican actor
Carlos María de la Torre, Cardinal of Ecuador
Carlos Torre Repetto (1905–1978), chess grandmaster from Mexico
Della Torre, an Italian noble family
Diego de la Torre, Mexican football player
Eugenio Torre (born 1951), Filipino chess grandmaster
Francisco de la Torre (fl 1483–1504), Spanish composer
Frank Torre (1931-2014), American baseball player; brother of Joe Torre
Joe Torre (born 1940), American baseball player, manager and executive
Joel Torre (born 1961), Filipino actor
José Aponte de la Torre, Puerto Rican politician
José Manuel de la Torre, soccer player
José María Torre, Mexican actor
Karl Wilhelm von Dalla Torre, Austrian entomologist
Leopoldo Torre Nilsson, Argentine film director
Lisandro de la Torre, Argentine politician
Manuel de la Torre, Mexican football player
Marie Torre, American TV personality
Moira Dela Torre, Filipina singer-songwriter
Oscar Torre, Cuban-American actor
Pablo S. Torre (born 1985), American sportswriter
Pio La Torre, Italian statesman
Roma Torre, American news personality
Todd La Torre, American Singer
Víctor Raúl Haya de la Torre, Peruvian political leader

Given name
Torre Catalano American film producer, director and writer

See also
Torres (surname)
Torrey (name)

Italian-language surnames
Spanish-language surnames